Karmış can refer to:

 Karmış, İskilip
 Karmış, Karaçoban